The Yorkshire Arboretum is an arboretum situated near Malton in North Yorkshire, England. It is run as a joint enterprise between Castle Howard Estates and Royal Botanic Gardens, Kew.

References 

Arboreta in England
Gardens in North Yorkshire
Botanical gardens in Yorkshire